Sarandí del Yí is a city in the Durazno Department of central Uruguay.

Geography
The nearest populated centre,  to the south, is the small town of Capilla del Sauce of the Florida Department.

History
A "Pueblo" (village) was founded here on 19 December 1875. On 13 June 1906 its status was elevated to "Villa" (town) by the Act of Ley N° 3.041, and then on 23 August 1956, to "Ciudad" (city) by the Act of Ley N° 12.308.

Population
In 2011 Sarandí del Yí had a population of 7,176.
 
Source: Instituto Nacional de Estadística de Uruguay

Places of worship
 St. Anthony of Padua Parish Church (Roman Catholic)

Sports 
The city is home to Club Nacional de Fútbol (Sarandí del Yi), an athletics club founded in 1911.

References

External links

INE map of Sarandí del Yí

Populated places in the Durazno Department